The Arcabuco Formation (Jar, JKa) is a geological formation of the Altiplano Cundiboyacense, Eastern Ranges of the Colombian Andes. The formation consists of thick beds of light-coloured quartzitic sandstones and conglomerates with occasional shales and dates to the Late Jurassic and Early Cretaceous periods; Tithonian to Berriasian epochs. Dinosaur footprints have been found in the Arcabuco Formation near the Iguaque anticlinal outside Chíquiza, Boyacá.

Etymology 
The formation was first defined by Scheibe in 1938 and named after Arcabuco, Boyacá. The type section of the Arcabuco Formation was redefined in 1985 by Galvis and Rubiano around Villa de Leyva.

Description

Lithologies 
In the Arcabuco Formation, in the Iguaque Anticlinal, dinosaur tracks have been found. The overhanging rock shelter of Sáchica in Sáchica, Boyacá, consists of the sandstones of the Arcabuco Formation.

Stratigraphy and depositional environment 
The age has been estimated to be Late Jurassic to Early Cretaceous. Stratigraphically, the formation is time equivalent with the Guavio and La Naveta Formations of the eastern and southern Altiplano respectively. The Arcabuco Formation has been deposited in a rift basin setting.

Outcrops 

The Arcabuco Formation is found apart from its original type locality near Arcabuco, in the anticlinal of Lake Iguaque between Villa de Leyva, Sáchica and Chíquiza, where the formation has been redefined in the Arcabuco Anticlinal.

Regional correlations

See also 

 List of stratigraphic units with dinosaur tracks
 Geology of the Eastern Hills
 Geology of the Ocetá Páramo
 Geology of the Altiplano Cundiboyacense

Notes

References

Bibliography

Maps

External links 
 

Geologic formations of Colombia
Paleontology in Colombia
Jurassic Colombia
Cretaceous Colombia
Jurassic System of South America
Lower Cretaceous Series of South America
Tithonian Stage
Berriasian Stage
Sandstone formations
Shallow marine deposits
Ichnofossiliferous formations
Formations
Geography of Boyacá Department
Muysccubun